

List of Ambassadors

 Emmanuel Nahshon
Simona Frankel 2015 - 2019
Yaacov-Jack Revach 2011 - 2015
Tamar Sam-Ash 2007 - 2011
Jehudi Kinar 2003 - 2007
Shaul Amor 1999 - 2003
Tsvi Magen 1998 - 1999
Harry Kney-Tal 1997 - 1999
Victor Harel 1993 - 1996
Mordechai Drory 1991 - 1996
Yitzchak Mayer 1991 - 1994
Avraham Primor 1987 - 1991
Yosefh Hadass 1983 - 1987
Yitzhak Minerbi 1978 - 1983 
Eliashiv Ben-Horin 1974 - 1978
Moshe Alon 1969 - 1974
Amiel E. Najar 1960 - 1968
Ambassador Gideon Rafael 1957 - 1960
Minister Joseph Ariel  1952 - 1957
Minister Michael Amir  1950 - 1952

References 

Belgium
Israel